This article provides a list of federal opinion polls that were conducted between the 2007 election and 2010 election.

JWS poll of 28,000
A JWS Research "mega-poll", published by Fairfax, polled an Australian record 22,000 voters in 54 marginal seats and a further 6,000 in safe seats late in the campaign. It revealed a national two-party preferred vote for Labor of 51.6 percent. Losses in Queensland and New South Wales were offset by the gains of Dunkley, McEwen (both 57 percent), and Cowper and Boothby (both 54 percent), with a total of 79 Labor, 68 coalition, 3 independent.

Newspoll
Newspoll federal polling, published in The Australian, consists of voting intention, better prime minister and leader satisfaction-dissatisfaction ratings, and is conducted via random telephone number selection in city and country areas nationwide, Friday to Sunday, usually each fortnight. Sampling sizes consist of around 1100–1200 electors. The declared margin of error is ± 3 percentage points.

Voting intention
(<) – since July 2010, Newspoll has not provided a separate Liberal and National primary vote, therefore from 23–25 July 2010 the Liberal column displays the coalition primary vote.

Leader ratings

Roy Morgan
The Roy Morgan poll consists of two different sampling. There is a face to face interview and a phone interview to sample voting intention, which is conducted via random telephone number selection in city and country areas nationwide.

References

See also
 2010 Australian federal election
 2007 Australian federal election

2010 elections in Australia
2010
Australia